Joan Shelley (born in 1985) is an American indie folk musician from Louisville, Kentucky, United States.

Career

Shelley has released a number of studio recordings. Her second album, Ginko, and third album, Farthest Field (with Daniel Martin Moore), were released in 2012 on Ol Kentuck. In 2014, Shelley released her fourth album, Electric Ursa, on No Quarter Records. In 2015 she released her fifth album, Over and Even, also on No Quarter. In 2017, Shelley released her eponymous sixth album. Her seventh album, Like the River Loves the Sea, was released in 2019.

No Quarter released Shelley's eighth album, The Spur, on 24 June 2022. Upon its release, the album received critical acclaim.

Personal life
Shelley attended the University of Georgia. She decided to go to the university due to Athens's strong music culture.

Shelley frequently works with her husband, guitarist and musicologist Nathan Salsburg. Shelley and Salsburg had a daughter in 2021.

Discography
Studio albums
By Dawnlight (2010, self-released)
Ginko (2012, Ol Kentuck/ok recordings)
Farthest Field – Daniel Martin Moore & Joan Shelley (2012, Ol Kentuck)
Electric Ursa (2014, No Quarter)
Over and Even (2015, No Quarter)
Joan Shelley (2017, No Quarter)Rivers & Vessels (2018, self-released on Bandcamp)Like the River Loves the Sea (2019, No Quarter)The Spur (2022, No Quarter)

With Maiden Radio
(Maiden Radio are: Joan Shelley, Julia Purcell and Cheyenne Marie Mize)Maiden Radio (2010, self-released)Lullabies (2011, Ol Kentuck)Wolvering'' (2015, Ok Recordings)

Singles
"Cost of the Cold" (2016, No Quarter)

References

External links
 
 

Living people
American folk musicians
Musicians from Louisville, Kentucky
1985 births
University of Georgia alumni